mktemp is a command available in many Unix-like operating systems that creates a temporary file or directory. Originally released in 1997 as part of OpenBSD 2.1, a separate implementation exists as a part of GNU Coreutils.

There used to be a similar named  C library function, which is now deprecated for being unsafe, and has safer alternatives.

See also 
 Filesystem Hierarchy Standard
 Temporary folder
 TMPDIR
 Unix filesystem

References 

Unix software
1997 software